Koldo Gorostiaga Atxalandabaso (born 30 May 1940) is a Spanish Basque university lecturer in law and economics, and politician. He served one term in the European Parliament from 1999 to 2004 as a representative of Batasuna, a Basque nationalist party.

Law lecturer
Gorostiaga was born in Bilbao and educated at the University of Valladolid and the University of Deusto, earning a law degree in 1963. He obtained a Doctor of Laws from the University of Barcelona in 1966, and later obtained a certificate of proficiency in English from Cambridge University. He has worked as a lecturer at the University of Barcelona and the University of Pau. He is also a Professor of the Basque Summer University, and a Professor and founding Director of the Cooperative Institute for Law and Social Economy at the University of the Basque Country.

Politics
Living mostly in the French Basque Country, Gorostiaga began working for the European Bureau for Lesser-used Languages in 1995, and also became a member of the Basque Country's Economic and Social Council. At the 1999 European Parliament election, Gorostiaga was nominated as Euskal Herritarrok candidate. He was elected to the last seat.

References

1940 births
Spanish legal scholars
Living people
People from Bilbao
Batasuna MEPs
MEPs for Spain 1999–2004
Academic staff of the University of the Basque Country